The Kār-Nāmag ī Ardašīr ī Pāpakān ("Book of the Deeds of Ardeshir, Son of Papak") (New ), is a short Middle Persian prose tale written in the Sassanid period (226-651).  The story narrates the story of Ardashir I, the founder of the Sassanid dynasty.  His own life story—his rise to the throne, battle against the Parthian king Ardawān (or Artabanus), and conquest of the empire by the scion of the House of Sāsān, as well as episodes concerning his heir Šābuhr and the latter’s son, Ohrmazd.

After Ardashir was born, son of Pabag's daughter and Sāsān, he spent his childhood in the court of Artabanus IV of Parthia and then ran away with a maidservant of the King. After several wars with Artabanus, Ardashir I defeated and killed the king, and thus could found the new empire. The Karnamag is permeated with Zoroastrian doctrine.

Manuscripts

The sole independent manuscript of this text to have been identified so far is codex MK, which was copied in 1322 in Gujarat by Mihrābān ī Kay-Husraw, a gifted copyist belonging to a well known family of scribes.  The book narrates the epic adventures of Ardashir I, the founder of the Sassanid Empire. The story relates how Ardashir's father Papak, dreamed that his father Sassan would be reborn as Ardashir.  According to the story, Ardashir I was the natural son of Sassan.  A rescension of the same story is found in the Shahnama.  However, the contents of the text draw from more ancient Iranian lore, since some traits of Ardashir’s life as narrated in this work reflect themes known from the legend of Cyrus the Great.

Mary Boyce, a British scholar of Iranian languages, commented that "[t]his is a short prose work, simple in style, probably written in Pars towards the end of the Sasanian period.  It too was evidently the work of priests, and a comparison of it with Firdausi's rendering shows how effectively Zoroastrian elements were obliterated in the Muslim redaction. The Kârnâmag contains some historical details; but its generally romantic character has been explained as due to contamination with legends of Cyrus the Great, still current then in Pars."

Plot

The story starts with the birth of Ardashir to Papak's daughter and Sāsān, a descendant of the Kayanian royal house. He leaves his home to be educated by Ardavan, but after an argument with Ardavan's son he is demoted to overseer of the stables. After some time, a favorite maid of the Parthian king Ardavan fell in love with Ardashir and informed him of a prophecy that had been announced to the sovereign by the chief astrologer about Ardashir's future greatness.  The maid escaped Ardavan's domain and together with Ardashir, they escape on two horses stolen from his stables along with a sizeable quantity of treasure, weapons, and armor.  Ardavan and his troops follow on the trail of the maiden and Ardashir.  During this pursuit, Ardavan questions passers-by, who tell them that had seen the couple on the run followed by a large ram. The king interrogates his Dastur about the meaning of this scene, and the sage answers that the ram represents the royal xwarrah, which had not yet joined with Ardashir.  In the Persian mythology, once a king possesses the divine xwarrah, he is invincible.  During the second day of pursuit, Ardavan is told that the ram sat on the back of Ardashir I’s horse.  He is then advised by the Dastur to stop his pursuit since Ardashir I now possesses the divine xwarrah.  The story follows with the description of Ardashir's triumph over Ardavan in the battle of Hormuzagān.  Then follows his campaign against a group of nomads and then his victory against Haftobād (a giant worm) through a stratagem suggested by the pious brothers Burzag and Burz-Ādur.  He defeats Haftobād by pouring molten copper down the creature's throat.

The last part of the story relates to the son of Ardashir, Shapur I, and the life of the son of the latter, Ohrmazd. Ardashir’s wife, the daughter of Ardawān, instigated by her brothers, makes an attempt on the king’s life. The plot fails and Ardashīr sentences her to death, notwithstanding her but the wise and compassionate Zoroastrian priest, without the knowledge of Ardashir, spares her life so that she may give birth to Shapur.  Shapur is raised in the house of the Mowbed. Ardashir had no knowledge of the priest sparing the life of his son.  According to the Shahnama, the holy man castrates himself in order to be beyond all suspicion. Years later the Mowbed tells Ardashir that he saved Shapur I and consequently is rewarded by Ardashir I.  An Indian astrologer foretells that Iran will only be strong if Ardashir's family is united with that of his mortal enemy Mihrag.  Ardashir, however had fought the family of Mihrag and exterminated them.  However, a girl from the family of Mihrag survives and marries Shapur.  Thus the son of Shapur, Ohrmazd, is born and he unites the entire Eranshahr under his command and receives tribute and homage from the other kings of the time.

Translations
The story has been translated to numerous languages. The oldest English translation was translated by Darab Dastur Peshotan Sanjana, B.A., 1896..

Middle Persian and modern Persian comparison

Middle Persian transliteration in Latin script:
pad kārnāmag ī ardaxšīr ī pābagān ēdōn nibišt ēstād kū pas az marg ī alaksandar ī hrōmāyīg ērānšahr 240 kadag-xwadāy būd. spahān ud pārs ud kustīhā ī awiš nazdīktar pad dast ī ardawān sālār būd.  pābag marzobān ud šahryār ī pārs būd ud az gumārdagān ī ardawān būd. ud pad staxr nišast. ud pābag rāy ēč frazand ī nām-burdār nē būd.
ud sāsān šubān ī pābag būd ud hamwār abāg gōspandān būd ud az tōhmag ī dārā ī dārāyān būd ud andar dušxwadāyīh ī alaksandar ō wirēg ud nihān-rawišnīh ēstād ud abāg kurdān šubānān raft.

Modern Persian translation:
در کارنامهٔ اردشیر بابکان ایدون نوشته شده‌است که پس از مرگ اسکندر رومی، ایرانشهر را ۲۴۰ کدخدای بود. اسپهان و پارس و سامان‌های نزدیک به آن‌ها در دست سالار اردوان بود. بابک شهریار و مرزبان پارس و از گماردگان اردوان بود و در (شهرِ) استخر نشیمن داشت. بابک را هیچ فرزند نا‌م‌برداری نبود. و ساسان، (که) شبانِ بابک بود، همواره همراه با گوسفندان بود و از تخمهٔ دارایِ دارایان بود. و اندر دژخدایی (= حکومتِ بد) اسکندر به گریز و نهان‌روش شده بود و با کُردهای شبان می‌رفت.

See also 
Pahlavi literature

Notes

External links
The Middle Persian text (transcription into the Latin alphabet)
Editions in the Internet Archive containing the text in the original Pahlavi script: 1. Nosherwan, 1896, 2. Sanjana, 1896 (note: the Latin transcriptions in these works are outdated)
English translation of the Book of the Deeds of Ardashir, Son of Babag
C. G. CERETI, "KĀR-NĀMAG Ī ARDAŠĪR Ī PĀBAGĀN" in Encyclopædia Iranica

Further reading
 Kassock, Zeke, (2013), Karnamag i Ardashir i Papagan: A Pahlavi Student's 2013 Guide, A typed version with an updated transcription and translation.

Sasanian Empire
Middle Persian literature
Persian words and phrases
Ardashir I